Leonardus Jonatan Christie (born 15 September 1997) is an Indonesian badminton player specializing in the singles discipline affiliated with the Tangkas Specs club. He won the men's singles title at the 2017 Southeast Asian Games and at the 2018 Asian Games. Christie was part of Indonesia's winning team at the 2020 Thomas Cup.

Career 
Christie was called up to join the Indonesian national team in 2012, after he reached the semi-finals of the 2012 National Championships in Solo, Central Java.

In July 2013, Christie won his first international senior title at 15 years old at the Indonesia International Challenge, after beating the experienced Alamsyah Yunus who is 11 years older than him in the final by 21–17, 21–10.

Christie started the 2014 season as the world number 1 in BWF boys' singles ranking. Although still competing in the junior tournament, Christie again has reached the finals of the senior event in the 2014 Indonesia International Challenge, but he has not managed to defend his title after being defeated by the Korean veteran Lee Hyun-il by 5 sets, 10–11, 11–9, 11–5, 8–11, 3–11. In October, he won the Swiss International.

In 2017, Christie reached the finals of the Thailand Open Grand Prix, and later the Korea Open Super Series event. He was defeated by  B. Sai Praneeth in Thailand and Anthony Sinisuka Ginting in Korea. In August, he won gold medals at the Southeast Asian Games in the men's singles and team event.

In 2018, Christie and the Indonesian men's team managed to defend the Asia Team Championships title after beating China 3–1 in the final. In May, he advanced to the finals of the New Zealand Open, but was beaten by two-time Olympic champion Lin Dan in straight games.  At the 2018 Asian Games in Jakarta, he won 21–18, 20–22, 21–15 over Chou Tien-chen and took the badminton men's singles gold medal for Indonesia. In the team event, he helped the Indonesian team earn silver medal.

Christie opened the 2019 season as number 11 in the BWF World ranking. He played at the Malaysia Masters, but had to defeat in the second round to reigning Olympic champion Chen Long, the head-to-head record between the players stood at 0–6. He then lost in the semi-finals of the Indonesia Masters to Anders Antonsen in straight games. In March Europe tour, he fell in the early stages of the All England and Swiss Opens. In April, he advance to the semi-finals os the Malaysia Open beating World number 1 Kento Momota in the second round, and Viktor Axelsen in the quarter-finals, both in straight games. His pace then was stopped by Chen Long in rubber games. This result allowed him to beat four out of the world's top five men's singles players (Kento Momota, Shi Yuqi, Chou Tien-chen and Viktor Axelsen) in the BWF World rankings. A week later in the quarter-finals of the Singapore Open, Axelsen avenged his previous defeat in a close rubber games, with a score of 24–22, 18–21, and 22–24.

In May 2019, Christie claimed two titles in the Oceania tour, by winning the New Zealand and Australian Opens. Christie then reached the finals of the Super 750 event, the Japan and French Opens. The other results of Christie in 2019 was the semi-finalists in the Hong Kong Open; the quarter-finalists in the Korea, Indonesia, Fuzhou China Opens and the World Championships. His unsatisfactory results came from the China Open and the Asian Championships, where he was defeated in the first round. He then qualified to World Tour Finals, but failed in the group stage. He reached a career high of number four in the BWF World ranking on 6 August 2019.

Christie competed at the 2020 Summer Olympics in Tokyo, Japan. He topped the group G standings after beating Aram Mahmoud and Loh Kean Yew. He lost to Shi Yuqi of China in straight games and was knocked out at the Round of 16.

In September–October 2021, Christie alongside the Indonesian team competed at the 2021 Sudirman Cup in Vantaa, Finland. He played a match in the group stage against Brian Yang of Canada, but was defeated in the rubber games. Indonesia advanced to the knockout stage but lost at the quarterfinals against Malaysia. He made up for his less than favorable performance in the previous tournaments at the 2020 Thomas Cup, notably sealing Indonesia's victory against Denmark at the semifinals in a 100-minute match against Anders Antonsen and against China in the finals against Li Shifeng. He continued his form at the Denmark Open, but was forced to retire from his quarterfinal match against Kento Momota due to a waist injury, which forced him to withdraw from the French Open. During the three tournaments in Bali, Christie was defeated by Srikanth Kidambi at the second round of Indonesia Masters, but bounced back by reaching the semifinals of Indonesia Open. Christie did not qualify for the 2021 BWF World Tour Finals.

2022 
Christie started his 2022 season with a second-round exit at German Open. After the tournament, Christie tested positive for COVID-19. Luckily, he tested negative after performing two tests, and was able depart to Birmingham for the All England Open. He lost to Chou Tien-chen in the quarterfinals of All England. Christie later won the Swiss Open, his first BWF World Tour title since 2019. In April, he finished runner-up at the Korea Open to Weng Hongyang of China. He then finished as runner-up of the Badminton Asia Championships against Lee Zii Jia. However, he bowed out of the 2022 BWF World Championships at the quarterfinals. Despite a few more early exits, Christie managed to qualify for the 2022 BWF World Tour Finals and reached the semifinals, where he was defeated by teammate and eventual runner-up Anthony Sinisuka Ginting.

2023 
Christie opened the 2023 season as number 3 in the BWF World ranking. At the season opener Malaysia Open, he was defeated in the second round by Kenta Nishimoto. In the following week, he reached the semi-finals of India Open, but was stopped by first seed Viktor Axelsen. Christie won the Indonesia Masters against teammate Chico Aura Dwi Wardoyo. He not only secured his first ever Super 500 title, but also created an all-Indonesian final men's singles final with Wardoyo; the first one since 2013.

Filmography 
In 2009, he made a supporting cast appearance in badminton-themed film King. The film, directed by Ari Sihasale and dedicated to the legendary Liem Swie King, also featured cameos by many notable badminton players such as King himself, Hariyanto Arbi, Hastomo Arbi, Ellen Angelina, Ivana Lie, Rosiana Tendean, Maria Kristin Yulianti, Fransisca Ratnasari, and in their youth, Kevin Sanjaya Sukamuljo, Rafiddias Akhdan Nugroho, Cisita Joity Jansen, Uswatun Khasanah, and Intan Dwi Jayanti.

Awards and nominations

Achievements

Asian Games 
Men's singles

Asian Championships 
Men's singles

Southeast Asian Games 
Men's singles

BWF World Tour (4 titles, 4 runners-up) 
The BWF World Tour, which was announced on 19 March 2017 and implemented in 2018, is a series of elite badminton tournaments sanctioned by the Badminton World Federation (BWF). The BWF World Tour is divided into levels of World Tour Finals, Super 1000, Super 750, Super 500, Super 300, and the BWF Tour Super 100.

Men's singles

BWF Superseries (1 runner-up) 
The BWF Superseries, which was launched on 14 December 2006 and implemented in 2007, was a series of elite badminton tournaments, sanctioned by the Badminton World Federation (BWF). BWF Superseries levels were Superseries and Superseries Premier. A season of Superseries consisted of twelve tournaments around the world that had been introduced since 2011. Successful players were invited to the Superseries Finals, which were held at the end of each year.

Men's singles

 BWF Super Series tournament
 BWF Superseries Premier tournament
 BWF Superseries Finals tournament

BWF Grand Prix (1 runner-up) 
The BWF Grand Prix had two levels, the Grand Prix and Grand Prix Gold. It was a series of badminton tournaments sanctioned by the Badminton World Federation (BWF) and played between 2007 and 2017.

Men's singles

 BWF Grand Prix Gold tournament
 BWF Grand Prix tournament

BWF International Challenge/Series (2 titles, 1 runner-up) 
Men's singles

 BWF International Challenge tournament
 BWF International Series tournament

Performance timeline

National team 
 Junior level

 Senior level

Individual competitions 
 Junior level

 Senior level

Record against selected opponents 
Record against year-end Finals finalists, World Championships semi finalists, and Olympic quarter finalists. Accurate as of 20 December 2022.

References

Bibliography

External links 

 

1997 births
Living people
Sportspeople from Jakarta
Indonesian male badminton players
Badminton players at the 2020 Summer Olympics
Olympic badminton players of Indonesia
Badminton players at the 2014 Asian Games
Badminton players at the 2018 Asian Games
Asian Games gold medalists for Indonesia
Asian Games silver medalists for Indonesia
Asian Games medalists in badminton
Medalists at the 2018 Asian Games
Competitors at the 2017 Southeast Asian Games
Competitors at the 2019 Southeast Asian Games
Southeast Asian Games gold medalists for Indonesia
Southeast Asian Games medalists in badminton